Janez Zavrl may refer to:

Janez Zavrl (football manager), Slovenian football coach
Janez Zavrl (footballer) (born 1982), Slovenian football player